Princess Louise of Schleswig-Holstein-Sonderburg-Glücksburg (6 January 1858 in Schloss Luisenlund, Kiel, Duchy of Schleswig – 2 July 1936 in Marburg an der Lahn, Hesse, Germany) was the second wife and consort of George Victor, Prince of Waldeck and Pyrmont. Louise was the third child and second eldest daughter of Friedrich, Duke of Schleswig-Holstein-Sonderburg-Glücksburg and Princess Adelheid of Schaumburg-Lippe; a niece of Christian IX of Denmark and a cousin of Queen Alexandra of United Kingdom, Frederick VIII of Denmark and George I of Greece.

Marriage and issue
Louise married George Victor, Prince of Waldeck and Pyrmont, son of George II, Prince of Waldeck and Pyrmont and his wife Princess Emma of Anhalt-Bernburg-Schaumburg-Hoym, on 29 April 1891 at Schloss Luisenlund. Louise and George Victor had one son:  Prince Wolrad (26 June 1892 – 17 October 1914) who would later be killed in action shortly after the outbreak of the First World War.

Upon her marriage to George Victor, Louise became the stepmother of seven children from her husband's first marriage to Princess Helena of Nassau. Louise's stepchildren included Emma, Queen of the Netherlands (only seven months her junior) and Princess Helena, Duchess of Albany. She was 41 years younger than her late stepson-in-law William III of the Netherlands. Louise died one and one half years before the birth of her step-great-great-granddaughter Beatrix of the Netherlands.

Ancestry

References

|-

1858 births
1936 deaths
Louise
Louise
Nobility from Kiel
Louise